The Atari Greatest Hits series is composed of two compilations of retro Atari arcade games & Atari 2600 games ported to the Nintendo DS. While listed on the Atari web site as free for iOS & Android, Atari Greatest Hits has been removed from both app stores.

Reception

Volume 1
Writing for IGN, Craig Harris rated Atari Greatest Hits Volume 1 6 out of 10, and said that the 30 dollar price was too high: "At most, this game is a 20 dollar value." Harris noticed that the Nintendo DS's small screen can not properly display games with vector graphics: "the 256 by 192 pixel density just can't display the fine visual details of Gravitar, Lunar Lander, and Asteroids." However, he praised the title's "excellent multiplayer support" and "spot-on emulations". Alex Morgen at GamingBits.com gave it 3.5 of 5 stars in a generally positive review. Harris and Morgen both said that many of the included titles would not hold gamers' attention for very long. Nintendo Power rated it 5 out of 10, while Nintendo Gamer gave it 22 out of 100.

Extras
Both volumes contain an art gallery of pictures from their playable arcade games, Atari 2600 manuals from their playable arcade games and credits that say the people who helped make them. Both volumes contain 2 other extras. While Volume 1 has a trivia game that gives players 20 randomly selected questions about Atari and Army Battlezone, a version of Battlezone commissioned by the US Army for Atari to train the gunners of the Bradley Fighting Vehicle, Volume 2 has 8 interviews from Nolan Bushnell, including video and audio (although the interviews don't have similar buttons to many video hosters) & an Atari 400 Basic engine.

Included games in Volume 1

Arcade Titles
Asteroids
Battlezone
The Bradley Trainer
Centipede
Gravitar
Lunar Lander
Missile Command
Pong
Space Duel
Tempest

Atari 2600 Titles
3-D Tic-Tac-Toe
Adventure
Air-Sea Battle
Asteroids
Atari Video Cube
Basketball
Battlezone
Bowling
Centipede
Championship Soccer
Dodge 'Em
Flag Capture
Football
Fun with Numbers
Gravitar
Hangman
Haunted House
Home Run
Human Cannonball
Math Gran Prix
Miniature Golf
Missile Command
Outlaw
RealSports Baseball
RealSports Boxing
RealSports Football
RealSports Tennis
RealSports Volleyball
Sky Diver
Slot Machine
Slot Racers
Sprint Master
Star Ship
Stellar Track
Submarine Commander
Surround
Swordquest Earthworld
Swordquest Fireworld
Swordquest Waterworld
Tempest
Video Checkers

Included games in Volume 2

Arcade Titles
 Asteroids Deluxe
 Black Widow
 Crystal Castles
 Liberator
 Major Havoc
 Millipede
 Red Baron
 Super Breakout
 Warlords (4 player support)

Atari 2600 Titles
 Backgammon
 BASIC Programming
 Blackjack (3 player support)
 Brain Games (2 player support)
 Breakout
 Canyon Bomber (2 player support)
 Casino (4 player support)
 Circus Atari (2 player support)
 Codebreaker
 Combat (2 player support)
 Combat Two (2 player support)
 Concentration
 Crystal Castles
 Demons to Diamonds (2 player support)
 Desert Falcon
 Double Dunk (2 player support)
 Fatal Run
 Golf
 Maze Craze (2 player support)
 Millipede
 Night Driver
 Off-the-Wall
 Quadrun
 Radar Lock
 RealSports Basketball (2 player support)
 RealSports Soccer (2 player support)
 Return to Haunted House
 Secret Quest
 Sentinel
 Space War
 Star Raiders
 Steeplechase
 Street Racer
 Super Baseball (2 player support)
 Super Breakout
 Super Football (2 player support)
 Video Chess
 Video Olympics (4 player support)
 Video Pinball
 Warlords (4 player support)
 Yar's Revenge

Notes

References

2010 video games
2011 video games
Atari video game compilations
Code Mystics games
IOS games
Multiplayer and single-player video games
Nintendo DS games
Video games developed in Canada